Tetradymite is a mineral consisting of bismuth, tellurium and sulfide, Bi2Te2S, also known as telluric bismuth. If sulfur is absent the mineral is tellurobismuthite and the formula is then Bi2Te3. Traces of selenium are usually present.

Crystals are rhombohedral, but are rarely distinctly developed; they are twinned together in groups of four; hence the name of the mineral, from the Greek for fourfold. There is a perfect cleavage parallel to the basal plane and the mineral usually occurs in foliated masses of irregular outline. The color is steel-gray, and the luster metallic and brilliant. The mineral is very soft (H = 1.52) and marks paper. The specific gravity is 7.2 to 7.9.

The type locality is Zupkov (Zsubko; Schubkau), Stredoslovenský Kraj, Slovak Republic where it was reported in 1831. It was first found, in 1815, at Telemark in Norway. It often occurs in high temperature hydrothermal quartz veins associated with native gold and in contact metamorphic deposits.

References

Attribution:

External links

Bismuth minerals
Telluride minerals
Sulfide minerals
Tetradymite group
Trigonal minerals
Minerals in space group 166